Reverse triiodothyronine (3,3′,5′-triiodothyronine, reverse T3, or rT3) is an isomer of triiodothyronine (3,5,3′ triiodothyronine, T3).

Reverse T3 is the third-most common iodothyronine the thyroid gland releases into the bloodstream, at 0.9%; tetraiodothyronine (levothyroxine, T4) constitutes 90% and T3 is 9%.  However, 95% of rT3 in human blood is made elsewhere in the body, as enzymes remove a particular iodine atom from T4.

The production of hormone by the thyroid gland is controlled by the hypothalamus and pituitary gland.  The physiological activity of thyroid hormone is regulated by a system of enzymes that activate, inactivate or simply discard the prohormone T4 and in turn functionally modify T3 and rT3.  These enzymes operate under complex direction of systems including neurotransmitters, hormones, markers of metabolism and immunological signals.

The levels of rT3 increase in conditions such as euthyroid sick syndrome because its clearance decreases while its production stays the same. The decreased clearance is possibly from lower Thyroxine 5-deiodinase activity in the peripheral tissue or decreased liver uptake of rT3. In addition, increased rT3 concentrations result from upregulated Thyroxine 5-deiodinase activity in critical illness, starvation and fetal life.

Reactions

References

External links
 

Iodinated tyrosine derivatives
Thyroid